This is a list of hospitals in Angola.  there are a total of 1,575 medical facilities in Angola.

Hospitals
The hospitals in the table below shows the name, location, affiliation, and number of licensed beds. Only the most notable hospitals in Angola are listed. The best hospitals are located in the country's capital city, Luanda.  The largest number of medical facilities in Angola are the health centers that are not listed.

See also
 Healthcare in Angola

References

Angola
Hospitals
Angola